Steven Barnett (born 15 June 1979) is a male Australian diver, who won a bronze medal in the 2004 Summer Olympics with diving partner Robert Newbery. He was an Australian Institute of Sport scholarship holder. His mother is the 1974 Commonwealth Games bronze medallist diver Madeleine Barnett.

References

External links 
Steven Barnett on Diving Australia

1979 births
Living people
Australian Institute of Sport divers
Olympic divers of Australia
Olympic bronze medalists for Australia
Divers at the 2004 Summer Olympics
Divers at the 2006 Commonwealth Games
Olympic medalists in diving
Australian male divers
Medalists at the 2004 Summer Olympics
Commonwealth Games medallists in diving
Commonwealth Games bronze medallists for Australia
Medallists at the 2006 Commonwealth Games